Péter Veres may refer to:

 Péter Veres (politician) (1897–1970), Hungarian politician and writer
 Péter Veres (volleyball) (born 1979), Hungarian volleyball player
 Peter Vereš (born 1982), Slovak astronomer